Gary Arnold Bradberry (born January 27, 1961) is an American professional stock car racing driver. He raced in the NASCAR All-Pro Series, and had top-ten points finishes from 1990–1993. After that, Bradberry made the jump to major NASCAR leagues. His younger brother was fellow NASCAR driver Charlie Bradberry, who died in an automobile accident in 2006.

Racing career

Winston Cup Series
Bradberry made his Winston Cup debut at Atlanta Motor Speedway in 1994, starting 12th and finishing 30th in  a Ford owned by Jimmy Means.

Bradberry ran four races in 1995, with the first two for his own team. However, he struggled, with a 41st at Michigan and 43rd at Charlotte. Then, for the other two races, Bradberry replaced Ward Burton in the No. 31 Hardee's Chevy, with finishes of 35th and 29th.

Bradberry's next job was at Sadler Brothers Racing, driving the No. 95 Shoney's Chevy in nine 1996 races, with a 23rd-place finish at Talladega Superspeedway being his best finish, albeit his best career finish to that point.

Bradberry's largest season was in 1997, when he ran a career-high 16 races. At first, he was running for Tri-Star Motorsports. However, in eight races, all Bradberry could manage was a 31st at Charlotte, causing him to lose his ride. Bradberry moved to Triad Motorsports and the No. 78 Hanes Ford. His best finish in that ride was a 25th at Darlington being the best run. His 44th in points would prove to be his best career year.

He began 1998 with backing from Pilot Corporation starting the year. However, Bradberry only qualified for 13 races and only had two top-25 finishes, his best run a 23rd at California Speedway, matching Bradberry's best career finish. He also qualified 8th at Charlotte, his first career top-10 start. In addition to twelve races for Triad, Bradberry drove the No. 35 Pontiac for ISM Racing at New Hampshire, after Triad chose to skip that race, finishing fortieth. He went on to a 48th-place finish in points.

In 1999, Bradberry's new associate sponsor PHARB Hangover Relief did not fulfil their obligations, and Pilot left soon after, causing the team to close its doors before even running a race. Bradberry's lone start in 1999 was at the season finale for Larry Hedrick Motorsports operation. He started 9th, but engine problems relegated him to 35th.

Bradberry made two more starts for Hedrick in 2000, finishing 41st at Texas and 33rd at Martinsville Speedway, and failing to qualify at Talladega Superspeedway. After those races, Hedrick closed its doors and Bradberry was left without a ride.

Bradberry was unemployed until 2002, when he ran at Michigan with Donlavey Racing, finishing 43rd due to handling problems.

Busch Series
Bradberry made four races in his Busch career, all coming in 1999. His debut came at Darlington, where he started 23rd and finished 32nd. Bradberry tacked on a 21st at Charlotte (best career start of 15th), 20th at Pikes Peak before having a hard crash at Michigan, finishing 43rd.

ARCA SuperCar Series
Bradberry was the 1994 ARCA Hooters SuperCar Series Rookie of the Year, and won a race at Flat Rock Speedway that season after his race car and equipment was recovered early on race day from thieves who stole it the night before the race.

Motorsports career results

NASCAR
(key) (Bold – Pole position awarded by qualifying time. Italics – Pole position earned by points standings or practice time. * – Most laps led.)

Winston Cup Series

Daytona 500 results

Busch Series

Craftsman Truck Series

ARCA Bondo/Mar-Hyde Series
(key) (Bold – Pole position awarded by qualifying time. Italics – Pole position earned by points standings or practice time. * – Most laps led.)

References

External links 
 

Living people
1961 births
People from Chelsea, Alabama
Racing drivers from Alabama
NASCAR drivers
ARCA Menards Series drivers